The Philippine Trench (also Philippine Deep, Mindanao Trench, and Mindanao Deep) is a submarine trench to the east of the Philippines. The trench is located in the Philippine sea of the western North Pacific Ocean and continues NNW-SSE. At its deepest point, the trench  reaches 10,540 meters (34,580 ft or 5,760 fathoms).

Immediately to the north of the Philippine Trench is the East Luzon Trench.  They are separated, with their continuity interrupted and displaced, by Benham Plateau on the Philippine Sea Plate.

Information 
The Philippine trench is hypothesized to be younger than 8–9 million years old. The central part of the  Philippine fault formed during the Plio-Pleistocene times  is considered to be an active depression of the Earth's crust.  The trench formed from a collision between the Palawan and Zamboanga plates. This caused a change in geological processes creating a subduction zone, that is  dropping the ocean floor deeper.   The rate of subduction on these plates is estimated to be about 15 cm per year.  A convergent zone borders an estimate of 45% of the Philippine Trench today.

Although there are vast areas of subduction zones, some authors have considered this region to have low seismic activity, though the USGS has recorded many earthquakes with magnitude ≥ 7.2 in the region as shown by the map to the side. Most recently, in 2012 the Philippine Trench experienced an earthquake of Mw 7.6 (the 2012 Samar earthquake). It hit the trench with a hypocenter depth of 34.9 km.  Areas adjacent to the subduction zones have experienced large seismic activity. In 1897, northern Samar experienced a Ms 7.3 earthquake while in 1924 southern Mindanao experienced one with a Ms 8.2.

Depth 
The trench reaches one of the greatest depths in the ocean. Its deepest point is known as Galathea Depth and reaches 10,540 meters (34,580 ft or 5,760 fathoms).

Sedimentation 
Sedimentation of the Philippine trench contains slightly metamorphosed, calc-alkalic, basic, ultrabasic rock and sand grains.  The southern area of the trench contains homogeneous blue clay silt and is poor in lime. Sand grains that were also found contained fresh basaltic andesite.  The sediments found in the trenches are hypothesized to have been deposited by turbidity currents.  A turbidity current is an underwater current that moves rapidly and carries sediment.

Significant quakes 
This is a list of significant quakes related to the Philippine Trench, which are 7.0+

Trenches in the Philippine region 
Known trenches in LuzViMinda are:
 Manila Trench
 East Luzon Trench
 Negros Trench
 Sulu Trench
 Cotabato Trench

References 

Philippine Sea
Oceanic trenches of the South China Sea
Philippine tectonics
Subduction zones
Geology of Indonesia